Forgotten Fishheads Vol. 27 is the second compilation album released by The Great Luke Ski in 2000, containing rare tracks and live tracks.  This album and the similarly titled Forgotten Fishheads Vol. 13 were originally given out to members of Luke's fan club, but have since become releases on their own accord.

Track listing
"Hey ALCON '98!" - 3:10
"Are You?!" - 3:13
By DJ Skrabble
"Play That Filky Music" - 3:29
Parody of "Play That Funky Music" by Wild Cherry
Song about the appreciation of filk music
Collaboration with Power Salad
"Enter Der Feuhrer" - 3:27
"Cheesy Movie - Curse My Soul" - 2:42
Parody of "Hot Patootie" by Meat Loaf
A song about Mystery Science Theater 3000
"Rasta Eye" - 0:34 (Hidden Track)
"Gump" - 2:28
Parody of "Lump" by The Presidents of the United States of America
A song about Forrest Gump from the film that bears the character's name
Performed live March 9, 1996
This is not a cover of "Weird Al" Yankovic's song of the same name, rather this is a song that Luke Ski wrote before he found out that Weird Al was parodying the same song using the same subject matter.
"Mr. Versatility" - 2:41
"I Kissed A Squirrel" - 3:07 (Original Recording)
Parody of "I Kissed A Girl" by Jill Sobule
A song about the characters 'Birdseed Bobby' and 'Dusty' from "Ray TV", a show produced by Luke and his friends
"Funny Man (The Dr. Demento Show Edit)" - 3:58
"Demented News" - 4:17
Performed live July 6, 1997 on the Whimsical Will show

The next 7 tracks are from the project "Ray TV"

"Keanu For Pepsi" - 2:05
"Dueling Arnolds" - 0:23
"John Carridine Col Lampin" - 1:48
"Dueling Keanus" - 0:33
"I Don't Know How To Read" - 0:39
"Dueling Billy Connollys" - 0:33
"Keanu For Pepsi (Dirty Version)" - 2:14
"It's Mancow" - 2:51
"Phone Massages" - 3:16
"Halitosis" - 3:38
Parody of "California Love" by 2Pac, Dr. Dre, and Snoop Dogg
A song about the oral disease Halitosis
Performed with Sudden Death and None of the Above
"Nummy Muffin" - 1:51
Cover of "Nummy Muffin Coocol Butter" from Mystery Science Theater 3000''
"He's Crazy Jay" - 1:55
"Gnome Productions" - 5:57
Performed by the Original GNOME Productions Crew

2000 compilation albums
Luke Ski albums